DEI Holdings is the US parent company of several brands of consumer audio electronics and vehicle security/remote start systems.  DEI Holdings is owned by New York City and Boston-based private equity firm Charlesbank Capital Partners.

History

The company that became DEI Holdings was founded by future US Representative Darrell Issa and his wife Kathy in 1982 as Directed Electronics, with Darrell Issa serving as the first CEO.  In 2000, Darrell Issa was elected to the House of Representatives, and Jim Minarik replaced him as CEO.

In 2004, the firm bought speaker company Definitive Technology; in 2006, it bought Polk Audio.

In 2008, the companies adapted a holding company strategy, and their parent became DEI Holdings, Inc.

In 2011, the company was bought by private equity firm Charlesbank Capital Partners.

In April 2013, the company combined Polk, Definitive Technology and the Boom Movement brands into a new division called Sound United.  

In August 2016, Kevin Duffy was named the company's CEO, replacing retiring CEO Jim Minarik.

In March 2017, the Sound United audio division acquired YS consumer electronics company D+M Group, whose brands included Denon, HEOS by Denon, Marantz and Boston Acoustics. At the time, D+M was the world's largest supplier of audio/video receivers.

In October 2020 Sound United LLC acquired Bowers & Wilkins.

In March 2021 Sound United LLC acquired Australia's leading importer and distributor of home entertainment systems QualiFi Pty Ltd. QualiFi Pty Ltd was the Australian importer and distributor for Blustream, Denon, Elan, Forte, Furman, HEOS, Jamo, Klipsch, Marantz, Niles, Stealth Acoustics, Sunfire, Thorens and Xantech brands of high-quality Home Entertainment components and systems. QualiFi was based in Mount Waverley, Victoria and incorporates a service department for the servicing and repair of all products distributed by them.

In April 2022 Sound United was acquired by Masimo.

Brands
DEI's former Sound United audio electronics division became the consumer audio part of Masimo including Denon, Marantz, Boston Acoustics, HEOS by Denon (under D+M Group), Polk Audio, Definitive Technology and Bowers & Wilkins.

References

External links
 

Audio equipment manufacturers of the United States
Companies based in San Diego
Electronics companies established in 2008
Loudspeaker manufacturers
Vehicle security systems